Takovo is a village in the municipality of Gornji Milanovac, Serbia. According to the 2011 census, the village has a population of 458 people.

The Second Serbian Uprising (1815–1817) under the leadership of Miloš Obrenović started in this village.

Gallery

See also
Monument of Culture of Great Importance
FK Takovo, a football club from nearby town of Gornji Milanovac, named after the historic village of Takovo.

References

External links 

Takovo before 185 years
 Takovo - museum  Complete guide through Serbia

Populated places in Moravica District